Michiel Arnoud Cor de Vaan (born 1973) is a Dutch linguist and Indo-Europeanist. He taught comparative Indo-European linguistics, historical linguistics and dialectology at the University of Leiden until 2014, when he moved to the University of Lausanne in Switzerland. De Vaan had been at the University of Leiden since 1991, first as a student and later as a teacher.

He has published extensively on Limburgian, Dutch, Germanic, Albanian, Indo-Iranian and Indo-European linguistics and philology. He has published more than 100 papers, has written several books and has edited conference proceedings and a handbook of Indo-European. He wrote the etymological dictionary of Latin and other Italic languages as a contributor to the Leiden-based Indo-European Etymological Dictionary project.

Books

 with Javier Martínez: Introducción al avéstico. Madrid: Ediciones Clásicas, 2001. 140 pp.
 English translation: Introduction to Avestan. Leiden / Boston: Brill, 2014.
 The Avestan Vowels. Amsterdam/Atlanta: Rodopi, 2003. 710 pp.
 (as editor): Germanic Tone Accents: Proceedings of the First International Workshop on Franconian Tone Accents, Leiden, 13-14 June 2003 (= Zeitschrift für Dialektologie und Linguistik 131). Stuttgart: Franz Steiner Verlag, 2006.

 with Alexander Lubotsky: Van Sanskriet tot Spijkerschrift. Breinbrekers uit alle talen. Amsterdam: Amsterdam University Press, 2010.
 (as reviser/editor): Robert S.P. Beekes, Comparative Indo-European Linguistics: An Introduction, 2nd edn. Revised and corrected by Michiel de Vaan. Amsterdam / Philadelphia: John Benjamins, 2011.
 with Rolf H. Bremmer Jr: Sporen van het Fries en de Friezen in Noord-Holland (2012, It Beaken : Tijdschrift van de Fryske Akademy, nr. 74).[Conference proceedings]
 The Dawn of Dutch: Language contact in the western Low Countries before 1200. John Benjamins, 2017. 613 pp.

References

External links
 Personal website at Lausanne University

1973 births
Living people
Dialectologists
Linguists from the Netherlands
Linguists of Germanic languages
Linguists of Indo-European languages
Academic staff of Leiden University
People from Son en Breugel